The Andalusia national football team is the national football team of Andalusia. They are not affiliated with FIFA or UEFA, because Andalusia is represented internationally by the Spain national football team. It mostly plays only friendly matches.

History
In the first half of the 1920s, the Sur regional federation, which encompassed the Andalusia region and organised the Campeonato Regional Sur for the local clubs (dominated by Sevilla FC), decided to follow the examples of the Catalan and Centro regional federations and selected a representative team for occasional friendly matches, however, they instead made their official debut in a competitive match, in the 1922–23 Prince of Asturias Cup, an official inter-regional tournament organized by RFEF. They participated in two editions, being knocked-out in the semi-finals by the eventual Runner-up on both occasions.

During the Iberoamerican Expo in Seville, 1929, Andalusia played a friendly match against Club Atlético Boca Juniors in Estadio de Heliopolis, known today as Estadio Benito Villamarín.

They rarely played again until 1963, when they were invited by the Castilian Federation to its 50-year celebrations, playing against Biscay and then Castile. Two years later, during the Andalusia Football Federation's own 'golden jubilee', the regional select played against Paraguay in Estadio Sánchez Pizjuán, Seville.

In the early years of the 21st century, Andalusia played an annual fixture, usually each winter, facing the likes of Estonia, Morocco, Latvia, Chile and Malta. However, other than the regions such as Catalonia and the Basque Country with leanings towards independence whose matches draw larger crowds, matches were rarely played by the Spanish regions in the subsequent years as they did not prove cost-effective to arrange. The main exception to this situation was when Andalucia faced Madrid for the latter's federation centenary in 2013, a repeat of their 1963 encounter.

Selected Internationals

Coaches 
  José Enrique Díaz
  Adolfo Aldana
  Joaquín Caparrós
  Manolo Ruiz Sosa

Notable players
  Kinké
  Diego Tristán
  José Antonio Reyes

See also
:Category:Footballers from Andalusia

References

External links 
List of matches in Roon Ba

Autonomous football team
Spanish autonomous football teams
Sports organizations established in 1928